Lange (rarely ;) is a surname derived from the German word lang "long".

Geographical distribution
As of 2014, 62.4% of all known bearers of the surname Lange were residents of Germany, 16.7% of the United States, 3.4% of South Africa, 2.5% of Poland, 2.3% of Brazil, 1.9% of France, 1.3% of Denmark, 1.2% of Australia, 1.0% of Canada and 1.0% of the Netherlands.

In Germany, the frequency of the surname was higher than national average (1:504) in the following states:
 1. Mecklenburg-Vorpommern (1:151)
 2. Brandenburg (1:230)
 3. Saxony-Anhalt (1:249)
 4. Saxony (1:276)
 5. Berlin (1:283)
 6. Schleswig-Holstein (1:296)
 7. Bremen (1:335)
 8. Lower Saxony (1:362)
 9. Thuringia (1:365)
 10. Hamburg (1:399)

People
 Alex Lange (born 1995), American baseball pitcher
 Algot Lange (1884 – after 1941), Swedish explorer
 André Lange (born 1973), German bobsledder
 Andrew E. Lange (1957–2010), U.S. astronomer
 Antoni Lange (1863–1929), Polish poet
 Artie Lange (born 1967), U.S. comedian and Stern Show regular
 Bill Lange (disambiguation)
 Carl Lange (disambiguation)
 Christian Lange (born 1967), German politician
 Christian Lous Lange (1869–1938), Norwegian politician and Nobel Prize winner
 Dagmar Lange (1914–1991), Swedish crime novel writer using the pen name Maria Lang aka "Poshs"
 Darren Lange (born 1971), freestyle swimmer from Australia
 David Lange (1942–2005), former Prime Minister of New Zealand (surname pronounced as long-ee)
 David Hadley Lange (born 1947), Canadian politician for Saskatchewan
 Dorothea Lange (1895–1965), U.S. photographer
 Eric Lange (born 1973), American actor
 Friedrich Albert Lange (1828–1875), German philosopher
 Gustav Lange (1830–1889), German composer
 Hans-Dieter Lange (1926-2012), German TV journalist
 Harry Lange (1930–2008), German illustrator and production designer for 2001: A Space Odyssey
 Helene Lange (1848-1930), German activist
 Helmut Lange, World War I flying ace
 Henrik Lange (1908–2000), Swedish lieutenant general
 Herbert Lange (1909–1945), German Nazi SS concentration camp commandant and Holocaust perpetrator
 Hope Lange (1933–2003), U.S. film actress
 Ina Lange (1846—1930), Finnish writer, pianist and music historian
 Jakob Emanuel Lange (1864–1941), Danish mycologist
 Jessica Lange (born 1949), U.S. film actress
 Jim Lange (1932–2014), American game show host
 Joep Lange (1954-2014), Dutch clinical researcher specialising in HIV therapy
 Johan Lange (1818–1898), Danish botanist
 Johann Joachim Lange (1670-1744), German Protestant theologian and philosopher
 Johann Peter Lange (1802–1884), German Protestant theologian
 John Lange, pen name of Michael Crichton (1942–2008), American author, producer, director, and screenwriter
 John E. Lange (born 1949), "United States Avian Influenza and Pandemic Ambassador"
 Johnny Lange (1905–2006), songwriter, author and publisher
 Joseph Lange (1751–1831), Vienna actor and painter, brother-in-law to Mozart
 Julius Lange (1817-1878), German landscape painter
 Julius Lange (1838-1896), Danish art historian
 Lange (musician) (Stuart Langelaan), British DJ
 Lola Lange (1922–2013), Canadian feminist
 Ludwig Lange (physicist) (1863-1936), German physicist
 Ludwig Lange (architect) (1808-1868), German architect and landscape designer
 Ludwig Lange (philologist) (1825-1885), German philologist and archaeologist
 Marilyn Lange (born 1952), 1975 Playboy Magazine Playmate Of The Year
 Max Lange (1832-1899), German chess player
 Michael Lange (born 1950), American television director and music producer
 Morten Lange (1919–2003), Danish mycologist and politician
 Mary Elizabeth Lange (Mother Mary Lange) (1784–1882), foundress of Oblate Sisters of Providence
 Norah Lange (1905–1972), Argentine author
 Oliver Lange (1927–2013), life-long pen name of American novelist John Warren Wadleigh, author of Vandenberg
 Oscar V. Lange (1853–1913), U.S. photographer
 Oskar R. Lange (1904–1965), Polish economist and diplomat
 Patrick Lange (born 1981), German conductor
 Robert John "Mutt" Lange (born 1948), record producer
 Rudolf Lange (1910 – after 1945), Nazi German SS officer, Holocaust perpetrator, and attendee at the Wannsee Conference
 Samuel Gotthold Lange (1711-1781), German poet
 Santiago Lange (born 1961), Argentine Olympic sailor
 Simone Lange (born 1976), German politician (SPD)
 Ted Lange (born 1948), U.S. actor
 Thomas Lange (disambiguation)
 Thor Lange (disambiguation)
 Ulrich Lange (born 1969), German politician
 Vincent Lange (born 1974), German volleyball player
 Wilfried Lange (1910-1993), German chess master

See also
Lange (disambiguation)
Peter Lange-Müller (1850-1926), Danish composer and pianist
De Lange (surname), Dutch surname
Lang (surname)
Langer (surname)
Laing (surname)

References

German-language surnames
Jewish surnames
Surnames from nicknames